John Gary Fencik (born June 11, 1954) is an American former professional football player who was a safety in the National Football League (NFL) for 12 seasons with the Chicago Bears. He played college football at Yale University and joined Chicago for the 1976 season after being selected by the Miami Dolphins in the tenth round of that year's draft. A four-time first-team All-Pro and two-time Pro Bowl selection, Fencik is the Bears all-time leader in interceptions and total tackles. He was also part of the 1985 Bears team that won the franchise's first Super Bowl title in Super Bowl XX.

Playing career
He played college football at Yale University, where he received his bachelor's degree in 1976. In 1985, he received an MBA from Northwestern University. John Madden once said in a broadcast that "Gary Fencik played football at Yale; that is like saying clean dirt".  At Yale, Fencik played wide receiver, catching 86 passes for 1,435 yards and 7 touchdowns from 1973 to 1975.  In his senior season, Fencik caught 42 passes and led the Ivy League with 729 receiving yards.

Considered too slow to be an NFL receiver, the Miami Dolphins drafted Fencik in the tenth round of the 1976 NFL Draft with the 281st overall selection, intending to convert him to defensive back. After rupturing his left lung in a preseason game against the New Orleans Saints, he was released in September and headed home to Chicago, planning to start a banking career until he received a job offer from the Chicago Bears.

In Chicago, he was the team's defensive captain through the 1980s including the 1985 Super Bowl championship season. He made two Pro Bowl appearances (1980, 1981). He was also awarded a gold record and a platinum video award for the 1985 Super Bowl Shuffle. Fencik and Doug Plank were dubbed "The Hit Men", a fact referenced by Fencik in The Super Bowl Shuffle.

In September 1986 he was featured on the cover of GQ magazine.  His picture also appeared on the reverse side of a Playboy centerfold, showing him and the December 1982 Playmate Charlotte Kemp, shopping at the Old Town Art Fair.

Fencik finished his career with 38 interceptions, which he returned for 488 yards and a touchdown.  He also recorded 2 sacks and recovered 13 fumbles, returning them for 65 yards.

Retirement
Following his football career, Fencik has worked in the finance industry. Fencik worked with Wells Fargo and UBS before joining Adams Street Partners in 1995. He has also worked as a sports commentator, mainly on WGN radio where he was a color commentator on Bears radio broadcasts from 1990–1993. During the 1988 NFL season he paired with James Brown as an NFL television commentator on CBS.

Personal life
Fencik and his wife Sandy have two children, Garrison and Evan. He is of Polish descent.

References

1954 births
Living people
American football safeties
American people of Polish descent
Kellogg School of Management alumni
American sports announcers
Chicago Bears announcers
Chicago Bears players
National Conference Pro Bowl players
National Football League announcers
Sportspeople from Chicago
Players of American football from Chicago
Yale Bulldogs football players